This article details the qualifying phase for weightlifting at the 2020 Summer Olympics .   The competition at these Games includes 196 athletes. Each competing nation is allowed to enter a maximum of 8 competitors, 4 men and 4 women. The IWF released its qualification list on 28 June 2021.

Qualification system 
For each weight class, 14 weightlifters qualify. These places are allocated as follows: 
 Eight from the IWF ranking list.
 Five continental places from that ranking list, with one per continent limited to NOCs without other qualified athletes.
 One from either the host nation (six weight classes) or Tripartite Commission invitation (eight weight classes).

An NOC could only qualify one athlete per weight class, and four per sex across all weight classes.

The maximum number of athletes per NOC across all weight classes could also be limited due to anti-doping violations: if any NOC had between 10 and 19 violations from the 2008 Summer Olympics period through the end of 2020 qualifying, it was limited to two men and two women. If any NOC had 20 or more violations, it was limited to one man and one woman.

Furthermore, six nations are currently suspended by the IWF for multiple doping offenses, and thus are barred outright from the 2020 Games. Four of these suspensions have been confirmed, while two are part of ongoing appeal proceedings.

Below are a list of nations with restricted numbers as a result of high levels of historic doping offences.

Excluded outright from 2020 Summer Olympics:
  
 
 
 

Restricted to one male and one female lifter for 20 or more violations:

  (40)
  (34)
  (34)
  (25)
  (21)
  (20, forfeited one place)

Restricted to two male and one female lifters for 20 or more violations:

  (forfeited five places, appeal proceedings ongoing) 

Restricted to two male and two female lifters for between 10 and 19 violations:

  (19)
  (18)
  (17)
  (15, forfeited one place)
  (14)
  (13)
  (13)
  (11)
  (11)
  (10)

Also forfeited places: 
 : forfeited one place due to positive doping test.

Places earned by the ranking list (including continental places) or Tripartite Commission were awarded to the specific athlete by name. Places for the host nation were awarded to the NOC, which could allocate them among the various weight classes. If Japanese weightlifters qualified through the ranking list, the number of host nation places would decrease (that is, the host places would only be used if Japan qualified fewer than three men and three women, and only so many as needed to bring Japan up to those numbers would be used). Unused host places would be awarded through the world ranking list.

Ranking points could be earned at various weightlifting events with a multiplier based on the level of event (gold events had a 1.1 multiplier, silver 1.05, and bronze 1.0). The best results in each of the three periods were considered (1 November 2018 – 30 April 2019; 1 May 2019 – 31 October 2019; 1 November 2019 – 31 May 2021), along with the overall best result. To qualify, the weightlifter must have competed in at least one event in each of the three periods, have competed in at least six events overall, and have competed in at least one gold-level event and one other gold- or silver-level event. These restrictions were loosened for athletes using host nation quota places (who needed only one event in each period and one gold- or silver-level event) and Tripartite Commission invitation places (two events overall, including at least one gold- or silver-level).

With all sporting competitions postponed because of the COVID-19 pandemic, the International Olympic Committee approved the IWF's decision to extend its qualifying program by a year. Hence, the third phase, severely affected by the pandemic, would be split into two distinct periods with an interval between 30 April and 30 September 2020. Scores attained during the interval would not be counted towards the IWF Absolute World and Continental Rankings, respectively.

Eligible ranking events were: 
 Gold – World and continental championships
 Silver – IWF events, including multi-sport games and championships
 Bronze – other international competitions

Timeline

Gold Level

Silver Level

Qualification summary

Men's events

61 kg

67 kg

73 kg

81 kg

96 kg

109 kg

+109 kg

Women's events

49 kg

55 kg

59 kg

64 kg

76 kg

87 kg

+87 kg

References

Qualification for the 2020 Summer Olympics
Qualification